Bentley's Conscience is a 1922 British silent drama film directed by Denison Clift and starring Robert Loraine, Betty Faire and Henry Victor.

Cast
 Robert Loraine - Clive Bentley
 Betty Faire - Diane carson
 Henry Victor - Fletcer
 Harvey Braban - Richard Glym
 Ivo Dawson - Murdoch
 J. Fisher White - John Carson

References

External links
 

1922 films
British drama films
British silent feature films
Films directed by Denison Clift
1922 drama films
Films based on British novels
Ideal Film Company films
British black-and-white films
1920s English-language films
1920s British films
Silent drama films